Severomorsk-3 may refer to:
Severomorsk-3 (rural locality), a rural locality (an inhabited locality) in Murmansk Oblast, Russia
Severomorsk-3 (air base), a naval air base in Murmansk Oblast, Russia

See also
 Severomorsk